The Ambassador of the United Kingdom to Austria is the United Kingdom's foremost diplomatic representative in the Republic of Austria, and head of the UK's diplomatic mission in Vienna.  The official title is His Britannic Majesty's Ambassador to the Republic of Austria.

For the ambassadors from the Court of St James's up to 1707, see List of ambassadors of the Kingdom of England to the Holy Roman Emperor and for the period 1707 to 1800 see List of ambassadors of Great Britain to the Holy Roman Emperor. 

Since 2006 the Ambassador to Austria has also been Permanent Representative to the United Nations and other international organisations in Vienna including the IAEA. Before 2006 this was a separate post.

List of heads of mission

Envoy Extraordinary and Minister Plenipotentiary at the Court of Vienna
1799–1801: Gilbert, Lord Minto
1801–1806: Sir Arthur Paget
 1805: The Earl of Harrington (Extraordinary Mission)
1806–1807: Robert Adair

Plenipotentiary at the Court of Vienna
1807: George Herbert, 11th Earl of Pembroke
1807–1813: no ambassador due to Napoleonic Wars
 1809: Benjamin Bathurst (Extraordinary Mission)
1813–1814: George Hamilton-Gordon, 4th Earl of Aberdeen

Ambassador Extraordinary and Plenipotentiary to the Emperor of Austria
1814–1823: Lord Stewart 
1823–1831: Sir Henry Wellesley
1831–1841: Sir Frederick Lamb
1841–1846: Sir Robert Gordon
1846–1850: John Ponsonby, 1st Viscount Ponsonby
1851–1855: John Fane, 11th Earl of Westmorland
1855–1858: Sir George Hamilton Seymour
1858–1860: Lord Augustus Loftus
1860–1867: John Bloomfield, 2nd Baron Bloomfield

Ambassador to Austria-Hungary
1867–1871: John Bloomfield, 2nd Baron Bloomfield
1871–1877: Sir Andrew Buchanan
1877–1884: Sir Henry Elliot
1884–1893: Sir Augustus Paget
1893–1896: Sir Edmund Monson
1896–1900: Sir Horace Rumbold, Bt.
1900–1905: Sir Francis Plunkett
1905–1908: Sir Edward Goschen
1908–1913: Sir Fairfax Cartwright
1913–1914: Sir Maurice de Bunsen
1914–1919: no representation due to First World War

High Commissioner to Austria
1919–1920: Sir Francis Lindley

Ambassador to Austria
1920–1921: Sir Francis Lindley
1921–1928: Aretas Akers-Douglas, 2nd Viscount Chilston
1928–1933: Sir Eric Phipps
1933–1937: Sir Walford Selby
1937–1938: Michael Palairet
1938–1945: no representation due to Anschluss and Second World War

Political Representative in Austria
1945–1947: Sir Henry Mack

Ambassador to Austria
1946–1948: Sir Henry Mack
1948–1949: Sir Bertrand Jerram
1949–1954: Sir Harold Caccia
1954–1958: Sir Geoffrey Wallinger
1958–1961: Sir James Bowker
1961–1965: Sir Malcolm Henderson
1965–1967: Sir John Pilcher
1967–1970: Sir Anthony Rumbold, Bt.
1970–1972: Sir Peter Wilkinson
1972–1976: Sir Denis Laskey
1976–1979: Hugh Travers Morgan
1979–1982: Donald Gordon
1982–1986: Michael Alexander
1986–1989: Robert O'Neill
1989–1992: Brian Crowe
1992–1996: Terence Wood
1996–2000: Sir Anthony Figgis
2000–2003: Antony Ford
2003–2007: John Macgregor
2007–2012: Simon Smith
2012–2016: Susan le Jeune d'Allegeershecque
2016–2021: Leigh Turner

2021–: Lindsay Skoll

References
J. Haydn, Book of Dignities (1851),

External links
UK and Austria, gov.uk

 
Austria
United Kingdom